The 2022 Koser Jewelers Tennis Challenge was a professional tennis tournament played on outdoor hard courts. It was the fifteenth edition of the tournament which was part of the 2022 ITF Women's World Tennis Tour. It took place in Landisville, Pennsylvania, United States between 8 and 14 August 2022.

Champions

Singles

  Zhu Lin def.  Elizabeth Mandlik, 6–2, 6–3

Doubles

  Sophie Chang /  Anna Danilina def.  Han Na-lae /  Jang Su-jeong, 2–6, 7–6(7–4), [11–9]

Singles main draw entrants

Seeds

 1 Rankings are as of 1 August 2022.

Other entrants
The following players received wildcards into the singles main draw:
  Nicole Coopersmith
  Alexa Glatch
  Elizabeth Mandlik

The following players received entry from the qualifying draw:
  Makenna Jones
  Hiroko Kuwata
  Maegan Manasse
  Christina Rosca
  Himeno Sakatsume
  Hibah Shaikh
  Iryna Shymanovich
  Marcela Zacarías

The following player received entry as a lucky loser:
  Raveena Kingsley

References

External links
 2022 Koser Jewelers Tennis Challenge at ITFtennis.com
 Official website

2022 ITF Women's World Tennis Tour
2022 in American tennis
August 2022 sports events in the United States